Santa Hates You are a German/Italian band who first came together back in 2007. The two band members are Jinxy - the Italian vocalist and Peter Spilles who is usually called PS. The central pillar on which the band was formed was their passion for dark music, rebellious humour and the macabre arts.

Peter Spilles, better known as PS, is also leader of the band Project Pitchfork.

History
One of the stranger aspects of the band is their habit for working at night. Late 19th century and early 20th century art and literature is also a great love for the band, and they find musical inspiration from movements such as  Symbolism, Surrealism and the Decadent Movement. This passion for different perspectives and psychological approaches are also an important element in their creation of music and art.

Band members
Jinxy: lyricist, vocalist, growler/singer, creative concept ideator (2007–2016)
Peter "PS" Spilles: composer, producer, arranger, synths, vocals (2007–2016)

Discography

Studio albums

Collaborations

Music videos
Official YouTube channel

References

Electropunk musical groups
German electronic music groups
Italian electronic music groups
German industrial music groups
Italian industrial music groups
Electronic body music groups
Italian musical duos
German musical duos
Musical groups established in 2007
Musical groups disestablished in 2016
Electronic music duos